Eloy Gila Marín (born 21 June 1988) is a Spanish professional footballer who plays as a forward for Andorran club FC Santa Coloma.

Club career
Born in Sabadell, Barcelona, Catalonia, Gila made his professional debut with UDA Gramenet in the Segunda División B, after playing two years with the reserves. In 2010 he signed with another club in his native region, Gimnàstic de Tarragona of Segunda División, initially as part of the farm team, CF Pobla de Mafumet.

However, Gila appeared in only two games for Pobla, and after scoring five goals in the main squad's preseason he was summoned by first-team manager Luis César Sampedro. He made his competitive debut on 19 September, coming on as a substitute for Álex Cruz in the 75th minute of a 0–1 home defeat against Rayo Vallecano.

Gila scored his first goal for Nàstic on 16 October 2010, in a 1–1 home draw with FC Barcelona B. He finished the season as the side's second-best scorer at five (only behind Berry Powel), as they narrowly avoided relegation.

Gila could not reproduce his previous form in the 2011–12 campaign, and after the arrival of Hugo Bargas in the January transfer window lost his importance in the first team. He was then loaned to third-tier Real Betis B on a six-month contract, playing his first match on 5 February against Cádiz CF and scoring his first goal later that month in the 2–1 away win over CD San Roque de Lepe.

On 23 January 2013, Gila was released by Gimnàstic. He signed for neighbouring UE Llagostera the following day, scoring a career-best 11 times in his first full season – plus once in the play-offs – as they reached division two for the first time ever.

Gila remained in the third division until his retirement, with CE Sabadell FC, Albacete Balompié, CD Mirandés and UE Cornellà. He achieved promotion with the second of those clubs.

References

External links

1988 births
Living people
Sportspeople from Sabadell
Spanish footballers
Footballers from Catalonia
Association football forwards
Segunda División players
Segunda División B players
Tercera División players
Primera Federación players
UDA Gramenet footballers
CF Pobla de Mafumet footballers
Gimnàstic de Tarragona footballers
Betis Deportivo Balompié footballers
UE Costa Brava players
CE Sabadell FC footballers
Albacete Balompié players
CD Mirandés footballers
UE Cornellà players
Primera Divisió players
FC Santa Coloma players
Spanish expatriate footballers
Expatriate footballers in Andorra
Spanish expatriate sportspeople in Andorra